Grégory Bourillon (born 1 July 1984) is a French former professional footballer who played as a defender.

Career
Bourillon signed for Stade Rennais in 2000 from hometown club Laval. He represented France at Under-21 level. Bourillon developed into a regular starter for the Breton team and was said to have a bright future ahead of him.

Paris Saint-Germain signed him to a four-year contract on 19 July 2007. On 1 February 2010, he signed for FC Lorient.

Bourillon was released by LB Châteauroux after the 2018–19 season.

He was in talks with clubs to continue his career but decided to retire.

After retiring as a player, Bourillon earned a university diploma in management of sports organisations in a two-year course. In January 2021 he took over as general manager of Stade Bordelais.

Personal life
Bourillon has an older brother, Yoann, who is also a professional footballer.

Honours
 Coupe Gambardella 2003
 Coupe de la Ligue: 2007–08

References

External links
 

Living people
1984 births
Association football defenders
French footballers
France youth international footballers
France under-21 international footballers
Stade Lavallois players
Stade Rennais F.C. players
Paris Saint-Germain F.C. players
FC Lorient players
Stade de Reims players
Angers SCO players
LB Châteauroux players
Ligue 1 players
Ligue 2 players
Championnat National 2 players
Championnat National 3 players